A Coffin for the Sheriff  is a 1965 Italian Spaghetti Western film directed by Mario Caiano and starring Anthony Steffen, Eduardo Fajardo, Fulvia Franco, George Rigaud and Armando Calvo.

Synopsis
A mysterious gunslinger named Shenandoah arrives to the town of Richmond, which is in terror of the famous criminal Lupe Rojo. Rojo and his gang carry a rule of lawlessness, but the townspeople allow him and his gang to stop there after robberies out of fear, while the town sheriff is being paid by the Rojo and looks the other way. Shenandoah quickly falls in with the group of outlaws, but he has a hidden past: he is actually former US Marshal Joe Logan and he is on a revenge mission, searching for the gang member who murdered his wife two years ago.

Cast
 Anthony Steffen as Joe "Texas" Logan/Shenandoah
 Eduardo Fajardo as Russell Murder/Murdock/Banner
 Fulvia Franco as Lulu Belle
 George Rigaud as Wilson
 Armando Calvo as Lupe Rojo/Red Wolf
 Arturo Dominici as Jerry Krueger
 Luciana Gilli as Jane Wilson
 Karl Hirenbach as Peter
 Miguel Del Castillo as Sheriff Gallagher
 Jesús Tordesillas as Old Man
 Tomás Torres as Lupe/Wolf henchman
 Miguel de la Riva as Lupe/Wolf henchman
 Lucio de Santis as Lupe/Wolf henchman
 Frank Braña as Lupe/Wolf Henchman
 María Vico as Lupe's/Wolf's woman
 Santiago Rivero as banker
 Saturno Cerra as piano player
 Luis Barboo
 Bob Johnson
 Rafael Vaquero
 Francisco Alacid
 Antonio Orengo
 Rafael Hernández
 Rafael Ibáñez
 Gonzalo Brano

In popular culture
Some parts of the soundtrack composed by Francesco De Masi are featured in the videogame Red Dead Revolver.

DVD release
Wild East released this on a limited edition R0 NTSC DVD alongside Blood at Sundown in 2014.

External links
 

1965 films
1960s Italian-language films
Italian Western (genre) films
Spaghetti Western films
1965 Western (genre) films
Films directed by Mario Caiano
Films scored by Francesco De Masi
Films shot in Almería
1960s Italian films